Abdullah Saleh Khamis Al Mukhaini Al-Junaibi (Arabic:عبد الله الجنيبي) (born 14 June 1988) is an Emirati footballer who plays for Ajman as a defender .

External links

References

1988 births
Living people
Emirati footballers
Association football defenders
Sharjah FC players
Al Shabab Al Arabi Club Dubai players
Al-Arabi SC (UAE) players
Al-Shaab CSC players
Al-Wasl F.C. players
Fujairah FC players
Ajman Club players
UAE First Division League players
UAE Pro League players